Choi Seung-hee (Chinese 崔承熹 November 24, 1911 – August 8, 1969) was a leading Korean modern dancer. Choi is an important figure of early modern dance in Korea, Japan and China who gained worldwide fame in the 1930s.

Biography 
Choi was born into a yangban-class family in Seoul, Korea during the colonial period, and was also known by the Japanese pronunciation of her name, Sai Shōki. Despite the Japanese policy of Sōshi-kaimei, a policy of changing Korean names to Japanese names, she retained her Korean family name of Choi. Sai is the Japanese pronunciation of the Chinese character for Choi, and was not considered Japanese.
When she was a child, her family faced financial trouble after their lands were taken away by the Japanese. Their only income came from her brother Choi Seung-il's manuscripts.

After graduating from Sookmyung High School at the age of fifteen, she tried to become a teacher to help her family financially. She passed seventh amongst 860 applicants, but was rejected due to her age. She was told to return a year later.

Her brother, Choi Seung-il, suggested her to join Baku Ishii to learn the art of dance. Baku Ishii was a prominent Japanese modern dance and ballet dancer (and the father of Kan Ishii who became an actor and a classical composer during the 1940s-1960s). She was mesmerized by Baku Ishii's performance, especially at his expressions of darkness and torment. Ishii accepted Choi, and even offered to teach her for free and send her to music school. After Choi gained her parents' reluctant permission, she left for Japan with Ishii, his wife, his sister, and his students on the next day on March 25, 1926.

Choi was Ishii's second Korean student. The first was Kang Hong-shik who left Ishii later and became a movie star under a Japanese name. (The maternal grandson of Kang Hong-shik is Choi Min-soo, who is known as one of the most acclaimed actors in South Korea now). At a time of anti-Korean sentiment heightened by the Korean independence movement and a false rumor that the ethnic Koreans were taking advantage of the 1923 Great Kantō Earthquake to commit violence, which triggered the Kantō Massacre upon the Koreans, Ishii was progressive and open to the Koreans.

Although the dance group performed successfully and brought in a lot of income, they struggled financially because of Ishii's debts. He did not have the sufficient salary to give to his dancers. To pay his debts, Ishii lowered the quality of the performances in exchange for quantity. Choi and two Japanese dancers decided to leave the group.

Choi returned to Korea and founded her dancing art institute called the 최승희무용예술연구소. She had both Korean and Japanese students. During this time in Korea, her brother introduced her to his alumni, Ahn Mak (originally named Ahn Pil-seung). The couple married on May 10, 1931. Just three months after their wedding, Ahn Mak was arrested for his connections with Communist sympathizers, and was released on October 15. Ahn Mak went to Tokyo for the winter semester exam. With Ahn's permission, Choi funded her institute from money earned from sending Ahn's manuscripts to the newspaper companies. Funding was also gained from the sponsorship of The Dong-a Ilbo newspaper company. Choi began to perform Korean folk dances during this time in Korea. Ahn returned temporarily after learning of Choi's pregnancy. Their daughter Ahn Seung-ja was born on July 20, 1932. Choi disbanded her institute.

Choi returned to Japan with her daughter and with a student from her disbanded institute, Kim Min-ja. Kim Min-ja wanted to follow Choi to Japan, and she offered to work as Seung-ja's nanny. Choi continued to study under Ishii where she distinguished herself as a talented dancer. She developed her own modern dances inspired by Korean folk dances, which had been considered by a lot of the Koreans as lowly works. It was Ishii and Ahn who suggested her to learn the Korean folk dances. Ishii introduced Choi to Han Song-joon who taught Choi more of the Korean dances. At a modern dance competition that was hosted by a monthly magazine 영녀계, Choi performed her Korean dances, one of which she was disguised as a man and artistically imitated her father's drunken dance. (After the competition at the end of one of her later performances 풍랑을 헤가르고, she took off her mask of an old man's face on stage).

Choi and Ahn researched historical texts on the forgotten Korean dances. Choi had already seen the sword dances of the shamans and the kisaengs in Korea. Choi sought an energetic style. Ahn found texts of ancient Korean militaristic sword dances from a library.

Choi began to work as a model. She used the money that she earned from modelling to fund her performances. She also began to appear in musicals. Ahn used his money that was meant for tuition fees to fund Choi's performance.

Ishii continued to have financial problems in 1936. In order to help him, Choi and Ishii's six students performed in Taiwan. Their performances in Japan and Taiwan were all successful. Not long after her return from Taiwan, Choi bought a two-story mansion in Tokyo.

A Korean marathon runner named Sohn Kee-chung won the gold medal in the 1936 Summer Olympics in Berlin. Because Korea was under Japanese rule, Son had no choice but to represent Japan. The Japanese Government-General of Korea had the CEOs of two Korean newspapers, The Joseon Joongang Ilbo (조선중앙일보) and The Dong-a Ilbo (동아일보), lose their jobs after they had the photo of the Japanese flag on Son's uniform erased on their news articles. After losing their jobs, the two former CEOs organized a celebration banquet for Sohn upon his return. They invited Choi who had returned temporarily to Korea. Years later, when Sohn heard of accusations on Choi being a traitor for Japan, it was said that he exclaimed, "then are you going to look at me as a supporter for Japan because I ran with the Japanese flag on my chest?"

She was supported by numerous Japanese intellectuals, including Yasunari Kawabata, and corresponded with both Jean Cocteau and Pablo Picasso. She was also a vocalist, and made recordings at Taepyeong Records and Kirin Records (in Manchukuo), before making her 1936 album Garden of Italy at Columbia Records Japan.

Foreign Tour 

On January 11, 1938, Choi, Ahn, and her pianist Lee Gwang-joon arrived in San Francisco. By this time, Choi and Ahn researched many different traditional dances including the bosal dance (보살춤). Choi's performances were held in San Francisco (January 22), in Los Angeles (February 2 - Ebell Theatre), and in New York City (February 19). The reactions of the audiences and the reviews were good. In New York City, she watched the performances of the famous Broadway musicians and dancers. In early November 1938, famous people such as Leopold Stokowski, John Steinbeck, Maurice Dekobra, and Charlie Chaplin went to the Guild Theatre (now the August Wilson Theatre) to watch her perform. Because of her use of the Japanese pronunciation of her name when she performed in the United States, she was criticized as a Japanese collaborator by Koreans in the Korean independence movement, but the Japanese government saw her as working for Korean independence, as pro-independence souvenirs were sold at her American shows.

Choi and her group left the United States on December 17, 1938, and they arrived at Le Havre, France on December 24. The performances were held in Paris (January 31, 1939), Brussels (February 6), Cannes (February 26), and Marseille (March 1). They performed in Switzerland during mid-March, and in Italy during late March. Starting from April 1, they performed in the smaller cities of Southern Germany. In mid-April, they performed in the Netherlands. All of Choi's performances in Europe received rave reviews. According to Choi's letter to her student, her traditional hat (the 초립동 모자) became a fashion trend in Paris. In 1939, in an international dance competition in Brussels, Belgium, Choi was appointed as one of the judges along with Rudolf von Laban, Mary Wigman, Serge Lifar, and Anton Dolin. After this competition, Choi was invited to perform at an international music and dance festival in The Hague, the Netherlands. Afterwards, she performed at the Théâtre national de Chaillot in Paris. The audiences included Pablo Picasso, Henri Matisse, Jean Cocteau, Romain Rolland, and Michel Simon. Picasso sketched a drawing of Choi and gave it to her after her performance.

The people in France were used to the tense situation in Europe that they learned from the newspapers and the radio news. Everyone whom Choi met in France believed that there would not be another world war. Hence, Choi and her group decided to stay despite a warning from the Japanese embassy. She was expecting to perform in Italy, Northern Germany, and Scandinavia. When Germany invaded Poland on September 1, 1939, France declared war on Germany two days later.  As the war in Poland raged on, Choi and her group began to evacuate. Their original plan was to evacuate to Italy. This was before Italy joined with Germany and Japan in a Tripartite Pact and before Italy declared war. An employee of the Marseille consulate general warned Choi that Italy might declare war, and that a Japanese ship called the Hakone Maru carrying about 190 Japanese evacuees would arrive the next day from Italy. Choi and her group embarked the Hakone Maru and evacuated to the United States instead. She continued her performing tour in the United States, Brazil, Uruguay, Argentina, Chile, and Mexico.

Return to Asia 
She returned to Japan. Japan changed to total war mode after the Imperial Japanese Navy's attack on Pearl Harbor. All performances needed permission from the Imperial Japanese Army, and to raise troop morale, performing for the military became a requirement. Starting on February 16, 1942, Choi performed for the Japanese armies in Korea, Manchuria, and North China. She performed dances inspired by Korea folk dance as well as Japanese, Chinese, Indian, and Siamese influenced dances. In 1943 she trained in Chinese Opera movement with Meilanfang in Shanghai and in started the Oriental Dance Research Institute in Beiping (now Beijing) in 1944.

On August 15, 1945, Japan surrendered and Korea became liberated. Choi was in China at that time. And she was pregnant. She witnessed the turmoil of the Chinese Civil War. She stayed hidden in fear that she would be accused of being a supporter for Japan. Ahn went to North Korea. Choi went to South Korea. Although she was happy to see her daughter again, she was saddened that South Korean newspapers accused Choi of being a collaborator for Japan. She asked US Lieutenant General John R. Hodge for financial support in her arts, but did not get any further details from him. She went to Rhee Syngman before he was president. He did not have the power to help her.

She went to Pyongyang, North Korea with her husband who was an active supporter of the Workers' Party of Korea. She met the chairman of the North Korean branch of the Korean Communist Party Kim Il-sung before he became the "Great Leader." This was before Kim had a firm control on North Korea; thus, it was a time before the purges. She found Kim to be very supportive. In those days, Pyongyang was a very small city that had very few artists. Kim Il-sung was fond of plays, and he thought about the political benefits that the public arts could give. He accepted many artists. Choi got her kids to join her from Seoul. Her daughter's name was changed to Ahn Sung-hee (안성희). Although Ahn Sung-hee was just a teenager at that time, she already grew tall like her mother, and she already had experience in performing with her. Choi established a dance school and was given an official position within the North Korean administration. On July 25, 1947, Choi sent her daughter, her sister-in-law, and her students to Prague, Czechoslovakia to perform in an international youth dance festival. In December 1949, following the founding of the People's Republic of China she and her dancers including her daughter performed in Beijing for cultural leaders as part of socialist cultural exchange. An Associated Press reporter asked Choi why she did not perform abroad like she used to. Choi replied that she would probably have the chance in the future, but added, "I'm a bird trapped in a birdcage."

In May 1950, Choi, her daughter, and about one hundred artists were sent to Moscow to perform. While they were in Moscow on June 25, 1950, North Korea invaded South Korea. Sending the artists was Kim's scheme to hide his intention to invade. Earlier, Kim had received permission from Joseph Stalin to invade, and on March 30, 1950, Kim went to Moscow to gain the finalization of Stalin's support for Kim's war. Kim received T-34-85 tanks, artillery, military planes, and his reinforced army exceeded South Korea's three to one. After Moscow, they performed in Leningrad (now Saint Petersburg), Kyiv, and Novosibirsk. The Korean War was raging on when they returned to Korea. In October 1950, Choi, her son, and her students evacuated to China where they performed. Their daughter rejoined them later after being separated away during the war.

Chinese Classical Dance 
Choi was influential in the development of Chinese Classical Dance and of Chinese-Korean Dance (N.E. China has a Korean minority), leading a project to pull the dance elements out of Chinese Opera. Upon returning to Beijing Choi worked with Chinese Opera performers Mei Lanfang, Han Shichang and Bai Yunsheng to analyze the movement in Chinese Opera as source elements for the development of Chinese classical dance. Chinese dance artist and director of the CAD Dance Ensemble, Chen Jinqing, identified Choi's work as a model for the field of Chinese dance as it took local folk material and elevated it using modern choreographic techniques.  In January 1951 The Chinese Ministry of Culture invited Choi to move her dance institute to Beijing. On March 15, 1951, Choi opened her dance academy in Beijing. She was required to add Chinese dances to her curriculum. Her program is credited with introducing a way of categorizing folk dance and classical dance, that was focused on the source of the material and not the age of the material. Folk dances were those that had been performed by often rural peasants, while classical dances were those that built on Chinese Opera movement. This continues to be a major way of classifying dance in China today. She was well known by the Chinese dancers of that time as someone who deeply influenced the way the Beijing opera was taught. 

In July 1951, Choi brought her dance group to Moscow to perform. Starting on August 5, her students including her daughter performed in East Germany. Afterwards, Choi and her group performed in Poland, Czechoslovakia, and Bulgaria. In that same year, she was asked to visit Beijing to perform for Chinese premier Zhou Enlai. She returned to North Korea when the war was still raging on. After the Korean Armistice Agreement, Choi established her dance academy (국립최승희무용연구소) in Pyongyang. She sent her daughter to study in The Bolshoi Ballet Academy in Moscow.

On February 25, 1955, North Korea's Minister of Foreign Affairs Nam Il announced the need to normalize relations with other countries for peace regardless of the social system. (Nam Il was formerly the General of the Army during the Korean War). He proposed an economic and cultural exchange with Japan. Ten Japanese peace delegates visited North Korea in May of that year. The delegates included Ashihei Hino, a famous writer. In Japan at that time, there was a movement to invite Choi to Japan. After the delegates' visit, more Japanese including Koreya Senda, Jukichi Uno, and Tomoyoshi Murayama met Choi in Pyongyang. The government and Ahn Mak feared that Choi would not return from Japan if she performed there. They did not allow Choi to leave for Japan.

There was a power struggle beneath Kim Il-sung between Kim Chang-man and Han Sul-ya in which Han's side lost. A purge followed. Ahn Mak was Han Sul-ya's right-hand man. Ahn was arrested in April 1959.

In 1967, she was purged by the party, and disappeared from public view. In October 1999, a defector named Kim Yong said that Choi was imprisoned in the same concentration camp (18호 관리소) that he was in. On February 9, 2003, an official announcement was made that she had died in 1969, and a monument was constructed proclaiming her a "People's Actress".

Films 
 1998 - Choi Seunghee: The Korean Dancer. Produced and directed by Han, Sung-Joon. VHS video. West Long Branch, New Jersey, United States: Kultur.

See also 
 Korean dance
Chinese dance
Wang Su-bok

References

Works cited 

 - See profile at WorldCat

Further reading

External links 

 
 Choi Sung-hee page at Korea.net
 Choi Seung-Hee page at KBS
 Dancer, Choi Sung-hee's student at Naver Cafe
 1933 Recording of Choi Seung-hee discovered at Korean Times
Hanto no maihime at Jiji shashin sokuhou

Modern dancers
South Korean female dancers
North Korean dancers
North Korean choreographers
Korean film actresses
Korean collaborators with Imperial Japan
People from Seoul
1911 births
1969 deaths
20th-century Korean actresses
South Korean emigrants to North Korea